WTMT (105.9 FM, "105.9 The Mountain") is an American classic rock radio station located in Asheville, North Carolina. The station is licensed by the Federal Communications Commission (FCC) to the nearby community of Weaverville and transmits on 105.9 FM with an effective radiated power (ERP) of 9.5 kW.

Asheville Radio Group, a subsidiary of Saga Communications, operates 105.9 The Mountain as well as adult contemporary WOXL and ESPN Radio 1310 WISE/970 WYSE. Artists include AC/DC, Rush, Linkin Park and Korn.

History
105.9 signed on the air in 1988 as WFSM licensed to Tazewell, Tennessee. It became WCTU in 1993.

Saga Communications purchased WCTU in 2005 and changed the call-sign to WTMT and its city of license to Weaverville, North Carolina, while preparing a move into the Asheville radio market during 2006 and early 2007.

On May 24, 2007, 105.9 signed on at its new transmitting site under test authority with various songs from different formats, nicknaming the station "The Lazer" during the stunt. On May 31 at 6:15 P.M, "105.9 The Mountain" officially signed on as a mainstream rock station under the slogan "Everything That Rocks". The first song was "Welcome to the Jungle" by Guns N' Roses.
105.9 has changed their playlist back to being mostly classic rock favorites, meanwhile there is very little recent or new rock songs that are played on air in its database as for right now.

The station's regularly scheduled weekday deejays include Lex and Terry, 6-10 a.m., 
and Craig Debolt, 3-7 p.m.

HD channels
In June 2015, W262CO began airing 80s-based classic hits as "Rewind 100.3". The station began by playing 10,000 songs in a row by such artists as Michael Jackson, Madonna, INXS and Bon Jovi.

On November 20, 2015 W288CQ and WTMT-HD3 launched as "Legends and The Young Guns, 105.5 The Outlaw", with a mix of current and classic country, as well as a smidgen of Southern rock. Artists will include Johnny Cash, Merle Haggard, Waylon Jennings, Kenny Chesney, Tim McGraw, Zac Brown, Marshall Tucker Band, The Allman Brothers Band and Lynyrd Skynyrd.

References

External links
Station Website

TMT
Classic rock radio stations in the United States
Radio stations established in 1988